The Greatest Trumpet of Them All is an album by trumpeter Dizzy Gillespie featuring Benny Golson, recorded in 1957 and released on the Verve label.

Reception
The AllMusic review states: "For many other jazz musicians this would be a 'good' or even 'fine' effort, but Dizzy Gillespie has recorded too much classic music for this disappointment to rate very high."

Track listing

 "Blues After Dark" (Benny Golson) - 6:29 
 "Sea Breeze" - 3:17 (Larry Douglas, Fred Norman and Rommie Beardon)
 "Out of the Past" (Benny Golson) - 5:32 
 "Shabozz" (Gigi Gryce) - 6:00 
 "Reminiscing" (Gigi Gryce) - 4:50 
 "A Night at Tony's" (Gigi Gryce) - 5:11 
 "Smoke Signals" (Gigi Gryce) - 5:04 
 "Just by Myself" (Benny Golson) - 4:47

Personnel
Dizzy Gillespie - trumpet
Henry Coker - trombone
Gigi Gryce - alto saxophone, arranger
Benny Golson - tenor saxophone, arranger
Pee Wee Moore - baritone saxophone
Ray Bryant - piano
Tommy Bryant - bass
Charlie Persip - drums

References 

Dizzy Gillespie albums
1957 albums
Verve Records albums
Albums produced by Norman Granz
Albums arranged by Benny Golson